The Sukhumi or Sukhum okrug was a special administrative district (okrug) in the Caucasus Viceroyalty of the Russian Empire, part of the Kutaisi Governorate from 1883 until 1905. The administrative center of the district was the Black Sea port city of Sukhum (present-day Sukhumi). The okrug bordered the Kutaisi Governorate to the southwest, the Kuban Oblast to the north and the Black Sea Governorate to the northwest and in terms of its area corresponded to most of contemporary Abkhazia. During 1905–1917, the Sukhumi okrug was one of the smallest independent (not part of any province or region) administrative units of the Russian Empire, second to the Zakatal okrug.

History 
In the 19th century, the territory of the Sukhumi okrug, some  containing 79,195 inhabitants, consisted of the Principality of Abkhazia (abolished in 1864) and the communities of Tsebelda, Samurzakan, and Pskhu community. In 1864–1866, the military district of Sukhumi was made up of the okrugs of Abkhaz, Bzyb, and Abzhua and pristavstvos of Tsebelda and Samurzakan. In 1883, the district was transformed into an okrug and incorporated into the Kutaisi Governorate. In 1905, the Sukhumi okrug was separated from the Kutaisi Governorate to be directly administered by the Viceroy of the Caucasus.

In April–May 1918, Georgian forces of the Transcaucasian Democratic Federative Republic prevented Soviet forces from taking the district. In June 1918, as a result of an agreement between the authorities of the Georgian Democratic Republic and the Abkhaz People's Council, the Georgian army occupied the district as well as the adjacent Sochi and Tuapse okrugs—the Georgian government aimed to "present the Volunteer Army with a fait accompli", using historical justifications for incorporating these districts. 

Georgia promised Abkhazia autonomy, however, it did not succeed in annexing it due to Anton Denikin recapturing the district in 1919 during the Sochi conflict. In December 1920, due to the changing tide of the Russian Civil War, the Georgian frontier in Abkhazia reached the Mekhadyr–Psou area. According to the Treaty of Moscow (1920), the Georgia–Russia border in Abkhazia was "traced along the Psou" rather than the Bzyb (further south) which had been the erstwhile boundary of the Sukhumi okrug. Following Georgia's sovietisation, Abkhazia and South Ossetia were transformed into autonomies which by a "large extent allowed these territories to be kept a part of Soviet Georgia".

Administrative divisions 
The subcounties (uchastoks) of the Sukhumi okrug in 1912 were as follows:

Demographics

Russian Empire Census 
The majority of the population indicated Abkhazian to be their mother tongue, with significant Mingrelian, Armenian, Greek, and Russian speaking minorities.

Kavkazskiy kalendar 

Notes

References

Bibliography 

 
Caucasus Viceroyalty (1801–1917)
Oblasts of the Russian Empire
Modern history of Georgia (country)
Kutaisi Governorate
History of Abkhazia
States and territories established in 1883
States and territories disestablished in 1921
1880s establishments in Georgia (country)
1920s disestablishments in Georgia (country)
1883 establishments in the Russian Empire
1921 disestablishments in Russia
Governorates of the Caucasus